Fort Dunree ( or Dún Fhraoigh meaning "Fort of Heather") is a coastal defence fortification located on the west side of the Inishowen peninsula, County Donegal, Ireland.

History

The fort is located on a rocky promontory accessed over a natural fissure. Originally built as part of a series of fortifications defending Lough Swilly during the Napoleonic Wars, located opposite Knockalla Fort on the other side of the lough. 

The fort was neglected after the peace of 1815. In 1874 it was armed with seven 24 Pounder guns.

It was remodelled in 1895 to have 2 x 4.7 inch (120 mm) QF guns below, and later 12 pounder (5 kg) QF and 2 x 6 inch (152 mm) guns in an upper land battery. The top of a hill overlooking the site was walled in to form a redoubt. Both 6-inch guns were operational during the First World War.

Treaty port

On 6 December 1921, the Anglo Irish Treaty was concluded. It provided for the establishment of the Irish Free State which happened on 6 December 1922. The Treaty included provisions by which the British would retain sovereignty over three strategically important ports known as the Treaty ports, one of which being described in the Treaty as:

 

Accordingly, even after the establishment of the Irish Free State, the Royal Navy continued to maintain its presence at Fort Dunree. Fort Dunree remained under British sovereignty until 3 October 1938 when, pursuant to the Anglo-Irish Trade Agreement of 25 April 1938, the territory was ceded to Ireland. On 4 October 1938, The Times reported on the handover of Lough Swilly at Fort Dunree on 3 October 1938 as follows:

Two brothers in-law, one hauling down a Union Jack and the other hauling up an Irish tricolour was indeed a poignant end to the long history of British military presence in the territory of the Irish state. It was also the last time sovereignty over any territory was ceded to Ireland.

The guns at the Fort were manned by the Irish Army until decommissioned following the Second World War. Fort Dunree was used by the Irish Army for training until 1990.

Preservation
The fort is now a military museum with detailed exhibitions, many restored guns such as BL 6 inch Mk VII naval gun and an old military camp.  There are also displays about the area birds, marine life and coastal vegetation.

Other facilities include a gift shop, auditorium, café and trail walks.

References

Publications

External links

The Guns of Dunree Military Museum - official site
Pictures of Dunree on Irelandscape
Photographic Portfolio of Dunree Fort Buildings

Museums in County Donegal
Military and war museums in the Republic of Ireland
Dunree